Pithys is a genus of insectivorous passerine binds in the antbird family, Thamnophilidae.

The species in this genus are specialist ant-followers that depend on swarms of army ants to flush insects and other arthropods out of the leaf litter.

The genus was erected by the French ornithologist Louis Pierre Vieillot in 1818. The type species is the white-plumed antbird (Pithys albifrons). It contains two species:

Species

References

External links

 
Bird genera
 
Taxa named by Louis Jean Pierre Vieillot
Taxonomy articles created by Polbot